David de Haen (1585, Amsterdam – 1622, Rome), was a Dutch Caravaggesque painter and draughtsman, active in Rome between 1615 and 1622.

Biography
David was born in Amsterdam and moved to Rome at a young age where he would remain the rest of his life. He worked with Dirk van Baburen in Rome on the decoration of the chapel of the Pietà in the church of San Pietro in Montorio (1617–20). In 1619 and the spring of 1620 de Haen and van Baburen were living in the same house in the Roman parish of Sant'Andrea delle Fratte.  He was a follower of Caravaggio and painted religious and historical paintings

References

External links
David de Haen on Artnet
Wayne E. Franits, University of Syracuse, Additions (and Subtractions) to David de Haen (c. 1597–1622), Lecture recorded at the National Gallery of Canada on June 18, 2011

1585 births
1622 deaths
Dutch Golden Age painters
Dutch male painters
Painters from Amsterdam
Dutch emigrants to Italy